Sea rescue is co-ordinated nationally by the Australian Maritime Safety Authority through the Joint Rescue Co-ordination Centre.

Western Australia
In Western Australia Sea Rescue groups are mostly volunteer-run organisations that specifically provide localised coastal search and rescue services along the Western Australian Coast. Some are part of the Department of Fire and Emergency Services.

The organisation of groups was previously named the Volunteer Sea Search and Rescue Association, between 1976 and 2000.  In 2000 it was renamed to the Volunteer Marine Rescue Association.

 Albany Sea Rescue Squad Inc
 Augusta Volunteer Marine & Rescue Group
 Bremer Bay Sea Rescue & Boating Club
 Broome Volunteer Sea Rescue Group Inc
 Bunbury Sea Rescue Group Inc.
 Busselton Volunteer Marine Rescue Group Inc
 Carnarvon Volunteer Sea Rescue Group Inc
 Christmas Island Volunteer Sea Rescue
 Cockburn Volunteer Sea Search and Rescue
 Cocos (Keeling) Island Volunteer Sea Rescue Inc
 Coral Bay Volunteer Sea Search & Rescue Group
 Denmark Volunteer Marine Rescue Group Inc
 Derby Volunteer Marine Rescue Group Inc
 East Kimberley Volunteer Sea Rescue Group
 Esperance Sea Search & Rescue Group Inc
 Exmouth Volunteer Marine Rescue Group Inc
 Fremantle Volunteer Sea Rescue Group Inc
 Geraldton Volunteer Marine Rescue Group Inc
 Hopetoun Sea Search & Rescue Group Inc
 Jurien Bay Volunteer Sea Rescue Group Inc
 Kalbarri Volunteer Sea Search & Rescue Group
 Lancelin Sea Search & Rescue Group Inc
 Leeman Sea Search & Rescue
 Mandurah Volunteer Marine Rescue Group Inc
 Margaret River Volunteer Sea Rescue Group Inc
 Naturaliste Volunteer Marine Rescue Group Inc
 Onslow Volunteer Marine Rescue Group Inc
 Peaceful Bay Sea Rescue Group Inc
 Port Denison Volunteer Sea Rescue Group Inc
 Port Hedland Volunteer Marine Rescue Group
 Port Walcott Sea Search & Rescue Group
 Rockingham Volunteer Sea Rescue Group Inc
 Shark Bay Volunteer Marine Rescue Group
 Two Rocks Volunteer Sea Rescue Group Inc
 Walpole Volunteer Marine Rescue Group Inc
 West Pilbara Volunteer Sea Search & Rescue Group Inc
 Windy Harbour Volunteer Marine Rescue Group
 Whitfords Volunteer Sea Rescue Group

References

 
Emergency services in Western Australia